Iridomyrmex exsanguis is a species of ant in the genus Iridomyrmex. Described by Forel in 1907, the species is distributed nationwide in Australia.

References

Iridomyrmex
Hymenoptera of Australia
Insects described in 1907